The old-settlers are the Russian settlers of the Russian North (the Pomors), Ural, Siberia (the Siberians), the Russian Far East (the Kamchadals) and the former Russian America (under the name "Russian Creoles") in the 11th – 18th centuries and their descendants. Among them, interethnic marriages, borrowing words from local languages and adopting the culture of indigenous peoples were practiced.

A principal part of them were Old Believers at least prior to the rise of the Soviet Union.

Subgroups 

 Alaskan Creoles - Creoles of Russian, Siberian, Eskimo, Aleut, and other Alaska Native ancestry.
 Chaldons – Creoles of Russians and native Siberians;
 Kamchadals – descendants of the native Kamchatkan peoples who assimilated with the Russians;
 Kamenschiks – Old Believers in Southern Siberia;
 Karyms and Gurans – métises of mixing Russians with Buryats and Evenks in Buryatia and Transbaikalia;
 Markovtsy – métises of mixing Russians and Chuvans in Chukotka;
 Pokhodchane or Kolymans – Russians in Arctic Sakha;
 Russkoust'intsy or Indigirschiks – métises of mixing Russians with Yukaghirs, Sakha and Evens in Arctic Sakha;
 Tundra Peasants – métises of mixing Russians with Evenks and Sakha on Taymyr;
 Yakutians or Lena Peasants – métises of mixing Russians with Sakha.

References

Russian sub-ethnic groups
Russian America
Commander Islands